Pseudopeltoceras is a genus of perisphinctoid ammonites belonging to the family Perisphinctidae.

These fast-moving nektonic carnivores lived during the Middle Jurassic, upper Callovian stage.

Distribution 
Fossils of species within this genus have been found in the Jurassic of Argentina, France and Germany.

References

External links 
 Ammonites.fr

Ammonitida genera
Perisphinctidae
Jurassic ammonites
Fossils of Argentina